Dialogue is the third solo studio album by American hip hop musician Thavius Beck. It was released through Big Dada in Europe on October 12, 2009, and through Mush Records in the rest of the world on January 26, 2010. "Go! / Away" was released as a single from the album.

Critical reception

Timothy Gabriele of PopMatters gave the album 6 stars out of 10, stating that "Beck's lyrics are presented in rapid-fire succession with a fairly straightforward style and delivery, like a laser-tongued Del the Funky Homosapien." Bram Gieben of The Skinny gave the album 4 stars out of 5, saying: "Smashing boundaries within electronic music and hip-hop simultaneously, it's hard to be anything but awed by this album, though it's likely to scare less adventurous hip-hop heads and dance music fans." Greg Cochrane of BBC described it as "[an] album packed with tightly-wound, chunky snares sounds, low chanting vocals and Beck's impressively deep flow drawn over the top like a darkening tarpaulin." Chris Ziegler of OC Weekly commented that "Beck combines the overcranked aesthetic of the Bomb Squad with the intensity of a band like Suicide, and you can hear the pixels crack and squelch between gunshots and sirens and Beck's fearless lyrics about the personal and political."

Track listing

Personnel
Credits adapted from liner notes.

 Thavius Beck – vocals, production
 D-Styles – turntables (3)
 Daddy Kev – additional drum programming (5, 10, 12)
 Debmaster – production (6)
 Giovanni Marks – production (11)
 Omar Ghaznavi – guitar (12)
 Sonny Kay – layout, design
 Angela Gomez – photography

References

External links
 

2009 albums
Thavius Beck albums
Big Dada albums
Mush Records albums